ݨ, (Arabic letter noon with small tah (U+0768), ṇūṇ), is an additional letter of the Arabic script, not used in the Arabic alphabet itself but used in Saraiki, Shina and Shahmukhi Punjabi to represent a retroflex nasal consonant, .
ڼ is the twenty-ninth letter of Pashto alphabet. It represents the retroflex nasal letter (IPA: [ɳ]) or Ṇ in Latin Alphabets, which is ण in Devanagari and ਣ in Gurmukhi.

It is a retroflex nasal consonantal sound  symbol, used in some spoken languages. Like all the retroflex consonants, the IPA symbol is formed by adding a rightward-pointing hook extending from the bottom of an en (the letter used for the corresponding alveolar consonant).
The unicode for saraiki letter ݨ was approved in 2005.
Previously, نڑ was used to represent a Voiced retroflex nasal.

It is a compound of nūn and ṛe ⟨ڑ⟩, for example:

Forms

See also
ں
ٻ
ڄ
ݙ
ڳ

References

External links
 Saraiki Omniglot
 Punjabi and Siraiki  Alphabet

Arabic letters